The Grand Olympics is a 1961 Italian documentary film, directed by Romolo Marcellini, made in 1961. It was nominated as Best Documentary Feature at 34th Academy Awards in 1961.

Plot
142 minutes of the film speak of events and athletes that have characterized the 1960 Summer Olympics in Rome. From the absolute protagonist Wilma Rudolph, called the black gazelle, to Livio Berruti, the first Italian to win a gold medal in a sprint race, to the deeds of Ethiopian marathon runner Abebe Bikila, who won the marathon racing barefoot.

Other Official Films of the Olympic Games
Olympia (1938), directed by Leni Riefenstahl about Berlin 1936
Tokyo Olympiad (1965), directed by Kon Ichikawa about Tokyo 1964

16 Days of Glory (1986), directed by Bud Greenspan about Los Angeles 1984

References

External links
 
 La grande Olimpiade. prima parte at European Film Gateway
 La grande Olimpiade. seconda parte at European Film Gateway

Italian documentary films
Documentary films about the Olympics
1960s Italian-language films
1961 films
1961 documentary films
1960s sports films
Films about the 1960 Summer Olympics
Films directed by Romolo Marcellini
1960s Italian films